

Hollywood Beyond were a British pop group from Birmingham, England formed in 1984.

Hollywood Beyond was the brainchild of singer-songwriter Mark Rogers. Their first single, "What's the Colour of Money?", reached No. 7 on the UK Singles Chart in 1986. The song also reached No. 8 in the Netherlands, No. 21 in Germany and No. 14 in Switzerland. The follow-up single, "No More Tears", peaked at No. 47 in the UK.

An album for Hollywood Beyond entitled If, followed on Warner Bros. Records in 1987, produced by Bernard Edwards, Mike Thorne and Stephen Hague. Former members include Andy Welch, Steve Elliott, Dean Loren, Mike Burns, Cliff Whyte, Carol Maye and Maggie Smyth.

Discography

Album
 If (WEA, 1987)

Singles

References

External links
 

English pop music groups
Musical groups from Birmingham, West Midlands